The Hospital is a 2006 Taiwanese drama starring Jerry Yan, Leon Dai, Janine Chang, Chang Kuo-chu, Ng Man Tat and Tang Zhiping. It was produced by Yang Ming International Production (揚名國際影視) and directed by Cài Yuè Xun.  The series comprises thirty-nine 60-minute episodes (including commercial time) and was broadcast on free-to-air China Television (CTV) (中視) from 15 August 2006 to 6 October 2006, Mondays to Fridays at 20:00.

The story of The Hospital is based on the 2000 Chinese novel of the same title by Taiwanese author Hou Wenyong (侯文詠). It depicts the power struggle and prestige in a national university-affiliated hospital in Taiwan, as well as the human relations within the community. Due to the resemblances in the title and story setting, Hou's novel is often compared alongside the Japanese novel Shiroi Kyotō, written by Toyoko Yamasaki.  Both works have been adapted into television series in Asia.

In 2007, the drama was nominated for eight awards at the 42nd Golden Bell Awards and won Best Director in a Television Series and Best Supporting Actor.

Cast

Hospital staff
Jerry Yan (言承旭) as Su Yihua (蘇怡華), M.D., the male protagonist of the story, professor at the National United University School of Medicine (NUUSM; fictional) and surgeon at its affiliated hospital (聯大醫院, NUUH; fictional), takes no interest in the hospital's internal politics but eventually becomes a tool used by others to bring down his mentor, Tang Guotai
Leon Dai (戴立忍) as Qiu Qingcheng (邱慶成), M.D., professor at the NUUSM and deputy director of the NUUH Surgery Department, sides with the peremptory Tang Guotai when Tang is in power but then joins Xu Daming to purge Tang's influence in the department after Tang's sudden stroke attack
Janine Chang (張鈞甯) as Guan Xin (關欣), M.D., anesthesiologist at the NUUH and later director of the NUUH Anesthesia Department, Su Yihua's lover who eventually parts with him as she escapes from the power struggles in the hospital
Chang Kuo-chu (張國柱) as Xu Daming (徐大明), M.D., professor at the NUUSM and director of the NUUH Department of Internal Medicine, arch rival to Tang Guotai and winner for the appointment of superintendent to the hospital, later father-in-law of Su Yihua
Ng Man Tat (吳孟達) as Tang Guotai (唐國泰), M.D., professor at the NUUSM and director of the NUUH Surgery Department, teacher and tormentor of Su Yihua who suffers a stroke when he learns his loss in the bid for hospital superintendency to Xu Daming
Tang Zhiping (唐治平) as Chen Kuan (陳寬), M.D., assistant professor at the NUUSM and surgeon at the NUUH, friend of Su Yihua who fails in his bid for associate professorship due to Tang Guotai's persecution and dies of stomach cancer shortly afterwards
Zhang Fujian
Huang Ruobai
Chien Te-men
Emma Ni
Liu Renzo
Jason Chang
Tang Kehua
Linda Liao
Huang Zongyou
Kelly Mi

Family members of the staff
Josephine Blankstein (許安安) as Xu Cuifeng (徐翠鳳), daughter of Xu Daming who eventually marries Su Yihua
Hsiu Chieh-kai (修杰楷) as Liao Qishu (廖其書), a clinic doctor who eventually marries Guan Xin
Ding Ning
Yang Wenwen
Zhang Kui
Shen Shihua
Hong Cen
Ke Shuqin
Jian Peien
Wu Yanxuan
Qiu Naihua

Patients and their relations
Saya as Liu Xinping (劉心萍), patient and admirer of Su Yihua whose hospitalization is highly publicized due to her identity as the President's daughter
Liang Xiushen (梁修身) as the President (fictional character), Liu Xinping's father
Deng An'ning
Lin Liyang
Shen Hairong
Xiang Liwen
Cai Mijie

Other roles
Kris Phillips (費翔) as Juang Mingzhe (莊明哲), M.D., former professor at the NUUSM and surgeon at the NUUH, Kuan Xin's lover when she was a student
Cheryl Yang (楊謹華) as Ma Yifen (馬懿芬), television journalist who develops an extramarital affair with Qiu Qingcheng
Yao Daiwei
Tender Huang
Tao Chuanzheng

Music
 Opening theme song: "你是我唯一的执着" (You Are My Only Persistence) by Jerry Yan - released on My Secret Lover
 End theme song "曾經太年輕" (Too Young) by Shadya (藍又時)

Books
 The Hospital Photobook /  白色巨塔寫真書 -

International broadcasts
Thailand: Channel 3 - 17 August 2007.  It broadcast every Friday at 23:00.
 Japan: NHK satellite channel - October 2007. It was the first Taiwanese drama broadcast in Japan.
 Philippines: Studio 23 ABS-CBN's UHF Channel - 5 October 2009

Awards and nominations
2007 - 42nd Golden Bell Awards (金鐘獎), Taiwan
 Nominated: The Hospital for Best Television Series
 Nominated: Leon Dai for Best Actor
 Nominated: Ng Man Tat (吳孟達) for Best Supporting Actor
 Awarded: Chang Kuo-chu (張國柱) for Best Supporting Actor
 Nominated: Saya (張惠春) for Best Supporting Actress
 Nominated: Cheryl Yang (楊謹華) for Best Supporting Actress
 Nominated: 吳洛纓、彭盛青 for Best Writing for a Television Series
 Awarded: Cài Yuè Xun for Best Director in a Television Series

Notes

References

External links
  CTV The Hospital official homepage
  ETTV The Hospital official homepage
 

Taiwanese drama television series
China Television original programming
2006 Taiwanese television series debuts
2006 Taiwanese television series endings
Taiwanese medical television series
Television shows based on Taiwanese novels
Television shows written by Luo Ying Wu